The Estádio Orlando Scarpelli is a football stadium inaugurated on May 27, 1961 in Estreito neighborhood, Florianópolis, Santa Catarina, with a maximum capacity of 19,584 spectators. The stadium is owned by Figueirense. Its formal name honors Orlando Scarpelli, who was Figueirense's president, and donated the groundplot where the stadium was built.

History

In September 1940, the stadium construction commenced.

In 1958, the ground was liberated to be used as a training field. During that time, Figueirense played at Estádio Alfredo Konder.

The inaugural match was played on May 27, 1961, when Atlético Catarinense beat Figueirense 4-0. The first goal of the stadium was scored by Atlético Catarinense's Ba
On August 15, 1973, was played the reinaugural match between Figueirense and Vitória. Shortly before that, the metallic bleachers, the lighting system, the dressing rooms and the field were completed.

The stadium's attendance record currently stands at 18,185, set on June 6, 2007 when Fluminense beat Figueirense 1-0, and became the champions of the Copa do Brasil de Futebol de 2007.

In 2000, the Coloninha section (bleachers where the supporters have to stand up, usually known in Brazil as gerais, meaning generals, or commons) of the stadium was replaced by a more comfortable one. In the same year the wire fence around the bleachers were built.

In 2002, the new lighting system, as well as the press cabins were built.

In 2005, Orlando Scarpelli became an all-seater stadium.

Concerts
Eric Clapton at the venue on October 14, 1990 during his Journeyman World Tour.
Shakira performed at the stadium on December 10, 1996 during her Tour Pies Descalzos.
The Black Eyed Peas performed in here on November 1, 2010 during The E.N.D. World Tour.

References

Enciclopédia do Futebol Brasileiro, Volume 2 - Lance, Rio de Janeiro: Aretê Editorial S/A, 2001.

External links
Templos do Futebol
Figueirense's Official Website

Orlando Scarpelli
Orlando Scarpelli
Sport in Florianópolis
Sports venues in Santa Catarina (state)